Gymnophthalmus speciosus, the golden spectacled tegu, is a microteiid lizard found in Mexico, Central America, and Colombia. It is a small, cylindrical lizard with a long tail and a tendency to reduced extremeties.

References

External links
Photos of Gymnophthalmus speciosus at INBio, Costa Rica

Gymnophthalmus
Reptiles of Central America
Reptiles of Colombia
Reptiles of Mexico
Reptiles described in 1861
Taxa named by Edward Hallowell (herpetologist)